The George Washburn House is a historic house at 772 River Road in Calais, Maine.  The -story wood-frame house was built c. 1855 by George Washburn, and is one of a trio of Gothic Revival houses standing in a row.  One of the others was built by George Washburn's brother Charles; the third, which is the most elaborate, was built by Alexander Gilmore.  Nothing of substance is known of the Washburns, or of who built their houses.  The George Washburn House was listed on the National Register of Historic Places in 1982, at which time its address was 318 Main Street.

George Washburn's house is three bays wide, with a side gable roof pierced at the ridge by two symmetrically placed chimneys.  The main facade is symmetrically arranged with a central entrance flanked by a pair of elongated windows.  The entry is slightly recessed, with the door flanked by sidelight windows and topped by a fanlight.  The second level consists of three steeply-pitched gables, aligned above the entry and windows below.  The central gable is covers a small balcony that projects, providing a sheltered area above the entry.  The balcony has spindled balusters and a decorative skirt.  The gable is supported by square posts, which are joined by a decorative cut-wood valance.  The gable end are decorated with bargeboard, with a finial and pendants.  The flanking gables are simpler, with paired narrow windows topped by carved projecting lintels.  These gable ends are also decorated with bargeboard and a slightly smaller finial and pendant.

At the rear of the house is a porch that was added in 1947 and enclosed in 1962.

See also
National Register of Historic Places listings in Washington County, Maine

References

Houses on the National Register of Historic Places in Maine
Carpenter Gothic architecture in Maine
Houses completed in 1855
Houses in Washington County, Maine
Buildings and structures in Calais, Maine
National Register of Historic Places in Washington County, Maine
Historic district contributing properties in Maine